Anatoliy Kyrylovych (or Anatoli Kirillovich) Puzach (3 June 1941 – 19 March 2006) was a Ukrainian football player and coach.

Early career
He first played for Progres Berdychiv and then for Polissya and SKA Lviv. In 1964, he became the top scorer of Ukrainian zone, class "B" scored 35 goals. The same year Lvivites reached the Soviet Union Cup quarter-finals. In spring 1964 the team of class "B" best players had friendlies against Dynamo Kyiv (1:2, 2:2) and after those games the quick striker with a good kick have been taken to Kyiv.

Honours
 Soviet Top League winner: 1966, 1967, 1968, 1971, 1990 (as a manager).
 Soviet Cup winner: 1966.

International career
Puzach made his debut for the USSR national team on 25 July 1969, in a friendly against East Germany national team and scored on his debut. He played at the 1970 FIFA World Cup final tournament and in the 1974 FIFA World Cup qualifiers. He was the first player in history to come on as a substitute in a World Cup game when non-injury substitutions were allowed for the first time in 1970. He replaced Viktor Serebryanikov in the opening match of the tournament against Mexico.

References

External links
  Profile

1941 births
2006 deaths
People from Krasnokutsky District
Russian emigrants to Ukraine
Soviet footballers
Soviet football managers
Soviet Union international footballers
1970 FIFA World Cup players
Ukrainian footballers
Ukrainian football managers
FC Polissya Zhytomyr players
PFC CSKA Moscow players
FC Dynamo Kyiv players
SKA Lviv players
Soviet Top League players
Soviet First League players
Soviet Second League players
FC Dynamo Kyiv managers
Soviet Top League managers
Ukrainian Premier League managers
Association football forwards
Sportspeople from Saratov Oblast